The Angelika Kauffmann Museum is a museum in Schwarzenberg, Vorarlberg (Austria) dedicated to the life and works of the Swiss painter Angelica Kauffman.

Although born in Chur in Switzerland, Angelica Kauffman had close ties to her father's home village of Schwarzenberg. Together, they worked for the local bishop, creating apostle frescoes and the high altarpiece. Numerous letters and donations to the community indicate her life-long connection to Schwarzenberg, even after having moved to Italy.

The building 
The museum is housed in the "Kleberhaus", an old farmhouse in the traditional wooden style of the village, which dates back to 1556. The exhibition area is about 220 square meters large. The former agricultural wing of the house was specially adapted for the museum. The architect, Helmut Dietrich, carefully renovated the building by highlighting characteristic features like old tie beams and dark log walls but nonetheless giving it a clean, modern touch.

Exhibitions 
In the 2019 exhibition "Angelika Kauffmann – Unknown Treasures from Vorarlberg Private Collections", many of her paintings were shown to the public for the first time, as a large parts of her oeuvre are owned by private collectors.

 2021: To Italy! Angelika Kauffmann and the Grand Tour
2019: Angelika Kauffmann – Unknown Treasures from Vorarlberg Private Collections
 2018: Er ist wer. Männerporträts von Angelika Kauffmann
 2017: Ich sehe mich. Frauenporträts von Angelika Kauffmann
 2016: Das bin ich. Kinderporträts von Angelika Kauffmann
 2015: Angelika Kauffmann. Residenz Rom

Local history museum 
In addition to the Angelika Kauffmann Museum, the Kleberhaus has been housing the Schwarzenberg local history museum ("Heimatmuseum", founded in 1913) since 1928. It documents the domestic and farming culture of the 18th and early 19th centuries.

Exhibitions 

 2020/21: Who owns the "Bödele"? Understanding a cultural landscape
2019: How it used to be at home
 2017/18: Heimarbeit. Wirtschaftswunder am Küchentisch
 2015/16: hüslo – bopplo – spielo (exhibition about toys)

References

External links
 Home page 

Local museums in Austria
Museums in Vorarlberg
History museums in Austria
Biographical museums in Austria
Angelica Kauffman